Niklaus Friedrich von Steiger (17 May 1729 – 3 December 1799) was a Swiss politician.

From 1787 to 1798 he was elected Schultheiss (chief magistrate) of Bern, Switzerland. He was the leader of the political faction that resisted the French invasion in 1798 and participated in the Battle of Grauholz.

See also
Johann Rudolf de Steiger, Niklaus' cousin.

References

1729 births
1799 deaths
Swiss politicians
Niklaus